Phaedon is a genus of Chrysomelinae (a subfamily of leaf beetles).

Selected species

 Phaedon armoraciae (Linnaeus, 1758) i c g b
 Phaedon brassicae Baly, 1874 g
 Phaedon cochleariae (Fabricius, 1792) g
 Phaedon conannus (Stephens) g
 Phaedon concinnus (Stephens, 1831) g
 Phaedon cyanescens Stål, 1860 i c g b
 Phaedon desotonis Balsbaugh, 1983 i c g b (desoto leaf beetle)
 Phaedon fulvescens Weise g
 Phaedon laevigatus (Duftschmid, 1825) i c g b (watercress leaf beetle)
 Phaedon menthae Wollaston, 1864 g
 Phaedon oviformis (J. L. LeConte, 1861) i c g b
 Phaedon prasinellus (J. L. LeConte, 1861) i c g b
 Phaedon purpureus (Linell, 1898) i c g b
 Phaedon salicinus (Herr, 1845) g
 Phaedon tumidulus (Germar, 1824) g
 Phaedon viridis F. E. Melsheimer, 1847 i c g b (watercress leaf beetle)

Data sources: i = ITIS, c = Catalogue of Life, g = GBIF, b = Bugguide.net

Gallery

References

External links

 Images of some Phaedon species at BugGuide.net

Chrysomelidae genera
Chrysomelinae
Taxa named by Pierre André Latreille